Louis Kevin Celestin is a producer better known as Kaytranada. This production discography lists the recorded performances, writing and production credits as Louis Kevin Celestin, as Kaytranada, or Kaytradamus.

Song names that are bold are singles, album names/releases are in italics. Please note, this list may be incomplete.

2010
Costa Joe – Petit Pays (Promo) (unreleased)
 "Petit Pays" (produced as Kaytradamus)
Costa Joe & Louie Phelps – Y'a Probleme! (Promo) (unreleased)
 "Y'a Probleme!" (produced as Kaytradamus)

2011
R.J. and Technique – Brain Suck (Promo) (unreleased)
 "Brain Suck" (produced as Kaytradamus)

2012
Green Hypnotic – Inc.O.A.S.T.Nito (November 20)
 "Montreal (Fuck 'Em All)" (produced as Kaytradamus)
Robert Nelson

 "Dorothée" (August 27)

2013
Cyber

 "Down Low" (May 15)

Koriass – Rue Des Saules (November 12)
 "Long Time No See"

Nine Six Honcho – Intro (Promo)
 "Intro" (Instrumental)

Robert Nelson – Des Hauts Et Des Bas – Single (Promo) (June 20)
 "Des Hauts Et Des Bas"

Shay Lia – Vacation (Promo) (unreleased)
 "Vacation (Interlude)" (Instrumental)

2014
Alaclair Ensemble – Toute Est Impossible (July 1)
 "Fastlane"
GoldLink – Sober Thoughts (Promo) (May 15)
 "Sober Thoughts" (April 1) (single)
Mick Jenkins – Rain (Promo) (September 18)
 "Rain"
Mobb Deep – The Infamous Mobb Deep (April 1)
 "My Block"
Reva DeVito – Friday Night (Promo) (April 17)
 "Friday Night"
Shay Lia – 3 Months (Promo)
 "3 Months" (September 16) (single)
The Celestics – various singles

 "Kill" (June 3)
 "Charles Barkley" (October 21)
Vic Mensa – Wimme Nah (Promo) (August 8)
 "Wimme Nah"

2015
Aminé – Calling Brio (August 31)
 "Buckwild"
 "La Danse"
 "YeYe"

Freddie Gibbs – Shadow Of A Doubt (November 20)
 "Insecurities" (feat. River Tiber ) (produced with Frank Dukes & Speakerbomb)

Illa J – Illa J (October 2)
 "Strippers" (produced with Potatohead People)

Kali Uchis – Por Vida (February 4)
 "Rush" (May 5) (single) (produced with BadBadNotGood )
 "Rush" (Instrumental) (produced with BadBadNotGood) (unreleased)

Koriass – Petit Love EP (December 18)
 "Quinze Minutes"

Leon, The Synergist – Synergize (July 7)
 "Hotel Banger"

Lou Phelps (aka Louie P) – Pree (Promo) (April 20)
 "Pree" (feat. Marvel Alexander)

Marvel Alexander – Don't Die Yet (January 23)
 "Don't Die Yet"
 "Illest Nigga"
 "Popcorn" (feat. Wiki) (produced with BadBadNotGood)
 "Popcorn" (Instrumental) (produced with BadBadNotGood) (unreleased)

Mick Jenkins – Wave[s] EP (August 21)
 "Ps & Qs (May 27) (single)
 "Your Love" (October 9) (single)
 "Your Love" (Promo) (unreleased)
 "Your Love" (Instrumental)
 "Head Ass" (Promo) (September 23)

Rejjie Snow – Blakkst Skn (Promo) (September 23)
 "Blakkst Skn" (feat. Rae Morris ) (December 7) (single)

Rome Fortune –

 ""Dance" (November 24)

Talib Kweli – Fuck The Money (August 14)
 "Butterfly" (feat. Steffanie Christi'an)
 "Butterfly" (Promo) (unreleased)
 "Butterfly" (Instrumental)

The Internet –

 "Girl" (June 23) 

Towkio – .Wav Theory (April 28)
 "Involved" (feat. Vic Mensa )
 "Reflection" (May 21) (single)

Wasiu – Physical (Promo) (February 12)
 "Physical" (February 12) (single)

Wiki – Lil' Me (December 7)
 "3 Stories" (June 8) (single)
 "Crib Tax" (January 8) (single)

Zak Abel – One Hand On The Future (August 28)
 "Say Sumthin"
 "Say Sumthin" (Promo) (unreleased)
 "Say Sumthin" (Instrumental)

2016
Anderson .Paak – Malibu (January 15)
 "Lite Weight" (feat. The Free Nationals United Fellowship Choir)

Azealia Banks – Slay-Z (March 24)
 "Along The Coast" (April 28) (single)
BadBadNotGood – IV

 ""Lavender" (November 16) (produced with BADBADNOTGOOD)

Chance The Rapper – Coloring Book (May 13)
 "All Night" (feat. Knox Fortune )
 "All Night" (Promo) (unreleased)
 "All Night" (Instrumental)
 "All Night" (Kaytranada Extended Joint)

Craig David – Following My Intuition (September 30)
 "Sink Or Swim" (produced with Tre Jean-Marie )

Exmiranda – Pink Panther (Promo) (December 22)
 "Pink Panther"
 "Pink Panther (Instrumental) (unreleased)

GoldLink – Fall In Love (Promo) (August 26)
 "Fall In Love" (feat. Ciscero) (November 22) (single)

J.K. The Reaper – Dressed 2 Kill (Promo) (September 8)
 "Dressed 2 Kill" (feat. Denzel Curry ) (November 8) (single)

Kali Uchis – Only Girl (Promo) (April 11)
 "Only Girl" (feat. Steve Lacy & Vince Staples ) (April 20) (single)

Katy B – Honey
 "Honey"
KAYTRANANDA – 99.9%

 01. "Track Uno" 
 02. "Bus Ride" (featuring Karriem Riggins and River Tiber) (produced with Karriem Riggins and River Tiber) 
 03. "Got It Good" (featuring Craig David) 
 04. "Together" (featuring AlunaGeorge and GoldLink) 
 05. "Drive Me Crazy" (featuring Vic Mensa) 
 06. "Weight Off" (featuring BadBadNotGood) (produced with BadBadNotGood)
 07. "One Too Many" (featuring Phonte) 
 08. "Despite the Weather" 
 09. "Glowed Up" (featuring Anderson .Paak) 
 10. "Breakdance Lesson N.1" 
 11. "You're the One" (featuring Syd) 
 12. "Vivid Dreams" (featuring River Tiber) 
 13. "Lite Spots" 
 14. "Leave Me Alone" (featuring Shay Lia) 
 15. "Bullets" (featuring Little Dragon)
 16. "Nobody Beats the Kay"

Lou Phelps – Rent Is Due (Promo) (April 1)
 "Rent Is Due" (feat. Key! (produced with Planet Giza))

Mick Jenkins – The Healing Component (September 23)
 "1000 Xans" (feat. theMIND) (produced with THEMpeople)
 "Communicate" (feat. Ravyn Lenae ) (produced with THEMpeople)

Mick Jenkins – Countdown 2 Midnight (December 16)
 "Aurora Borealis" (produced with THEMpeople)

Mick Jenkins – The Artful Dodger (Promo)
 "The Artful Dodger" (produced with THEMpeople)
 "The Artful Dodger" (Instrumental) (produced with THEMpeople)
Reva DeVito – The Move EP (September 13)
 "So Bad"
 "The Move"

River Tiber – Red Bull Sound Select
 "Gravity" (produced with River Tiber)
 "Illusions" (feat. Pusha T ) (produced with River Tiber & Doc McKinney)

Rome Fortune – Jerome Raheem Fortune (February 26)
 "Dance" (November 24) (single)

Sinéad Harnett – Sinéad Harnett EP (August 4)
 "Say What You Mean"
Wiki –

 "Crib Tax" (January 8)

2017
Alicia Keys – Sweet F'n Love (Promo) (January 12)
 "Sweet F'n Love"

Antwon – Sunnyvale Gardens (October 5)
 "What I Do" (July 22) (single)

Buddy – Ocean & Montana EP (May 19)
 "A Lite"
 "Find Me" (May 19) (single)
 "Guillotine"
 "Love Or Something"
 "World Of Wonders" (June 14) (single)
Cadence Weapon – 
 "My Crew (Woooo)" (May 3) (single)

Cassie – Don't Play It Safe (Promo) (December 22)
 "Don't Play It Safe" (January 9) (single)

Chance The Rapper – And They Say (Promo) (unreleased)
 And They Say"
 And They Say" (Instrumental)

Chewii – PuNoni (Promo) (May 23)
 "PuNoni" (feat. Govales) (May 24) (single)

Freddie Gibbs – You Only Live 2wice (March 31)
 "Alexys" (produced with BadBadNotGood)

GoldLink – At What Cost (March 24)
 "Hands On Your Knees" (feat. Kokayi)
 "Have You Seen That Girl"
 "Meditation" (feat. Jazmine Sullivan) (August 21) (single)

GoldLink – Meditation (Promo) (unreleased)
 "Meditation" (Instrumental)

Griff Cowan – Cocaine Testarossa (Promo) (August 11)
 "Cocaine Testarossa"

Ivan Ave – Also (Promo) (January 20)
 "Also" (January 20) (single) (produced with Kiefer)

Ivan Ave – Every Eye (November 10)
 "Steaming" (March 23) (single) (produced with DāM-FunK)

Lou Phelps – 001: Experiments EP (April 12)
 "Average" (feat. KALLITECHNIS) (January 27) (single)
 "I Got It" (feat. KALLITECHNIS)
 "Last Call" (feat. Bishop Nehru)
 "Massively Massive Part 2"
 "My Forte" (feat. CJ Flemings)
 "What Time Is It" (feat. Innanet James) (August 4) (single)
 "What Time Is It" (Interlude) (August 4) (single)
 "What We Been Thru"

Matt Martians – The Drum Chord Theory (VLS) (January 27)
 "28" (produced with BadBadNotGood)
 "28" (Instrumental) (produced with BadBadNotGood) (unreleased)

Nick Murphy (aka Chet Faker) – Missing Link EP (May 9)
 "Your Time"

Sinéad Harnett – Chapter One (June 1)
 "Heal You"

Shay Lia – What's Your Problem (Promo) (June 26)
 "What's Your Problem" (November 2) (single)
 "What's Your Problem" (Instrumental)

Shay Lia – Losing Her (Promo) (March 24)
 "Losing Her" (March 27) (single)

Snoop Dogg – Neva Left
 "Lavender (Nightfall Remix)" (March 12)

Sunni Colón – Little Things (Promo) (August 10)
 "Little Things"

Talib Kweli – Radio Silence (November 17)
 "Traveling Light" (feat. Anderson .Paak) (November 17) (single)

Wasiu – MTLIENS 2 (October 27)
 "Tabula Rasa"

Yoshua – Tulou (July 7)
 "Weight Off" (feat. Baby-D ) (produced with BadBadNotGood)

2018
Antwon –

 "What I Do" (July 22)

Bishop Nehru – Elevators: Act I & II (March 16)
 "Driftin'"
 "Get Away"
 "No Idea"
 "The Game Of Life"
 "Up Up & Away" (feat. Lion Babe )

Cadence Weapon – Cadence Weapon (January 19)
 "My Crew (Woooo)" (May 3) (single)
Cassie –

 "Don't Play It Safe" (January 9)

Costa Joe – Guerrier (Promo) (March 31)
 "Guerrier"

Craig David – The Time Is Now (January 26)
 "Live In The Moment" (feat. GoldLink)

Diggy – Goin (Promo) (October 27)
 "Goin'" (single) (October 27)

Govales – G Spot (February 23)
 "All In"
 "Out Of This World"
Ivan Ave –

 "Steaming" (March 23)

Kelela – TAKE ME A_PART, THE REMIXES

 02. "Waitin'" (Kaytranada's 115 BPM Edit) (single, September 26)

Lauren Faith – "Just A Little" single(August 16)
 "Just A Little"

Lou Phelps – 002/Love Me (September 21)
 02. "Come Inside" (feat. Jazz Cartier) (single, March 29)
 "Come Inside" (hidden interlude)
 05. "Miss Phatty" (single, September 10) (produced with BadBadNotGood)
 08. "Higher" (produced with Karriem Riggins)
 09. "Go!"
 10. "Want To (For The Youth)" (single, May 23)

Mick Jenkins – Pieces Of A Man (October 26)
 09. "Padded Locks" (feat. Ghostface Killah) (single, October 11)
 16. "Understood" (single, October 21) (produced with Alexander Sowinski of BadBadNotGood)
Mick Jenkins – "What Am I To Do" single
 "What Am I To Do"

Rejjie Snow – Dear Annie (February 16)
 10. "Egyptian Luvr" (feat. Aminé & Dana Williams)

Shay Lia – various singles
 "Cherish" (February 2)
 "Funky Thang" (August 11)
 "Vacation (Interlude)"

VanJess – Silk Canvas (July 27)
 09. "Another Lover"

2019
KAYTRANADA – Bubba

 01. "Do It" 
 02. "2 the Music" (featuring Iman Omari)
 03. "Go DJ" (featuring SiR) 
 04. "Gray Area" (featuring Mick Jenkins) 
 05. "Puff Lah" 
 06. "10%" (featuring Kali Uchis) 
 07. "Need It" (featuring Masego) 
 08. "Taste" (featuring VanJess) 
 09. "Oh No" (featuring Estelle) 
 10. "What You Need" (featuring Charlotte Day Wilson) 
 11. "Vex Oh" (featuring GoldLink, Eight9fly and Ari PenSmith) 
 12. "Scared to Death" 
 13. "Freefall" (featuring Durand Bernarr) 
 14. "Culture" (featuring Teedra Moses) 
 15. "The Worst in Me" (featuring Tinashe) 
 16. "September 21"
 17. "Midsection" (featuring Pharrell Williams)

KAYTRANADA – "Dysfunctional" single

 01. "DYSFUNCTIONAL" (feat. VanJess)
 02. "DYSFUNCTIONAL (INSTRUMENTAL)" (feat. VanJess)

Lauren Faith – Cosmic EP (July 25)
 "Jheeze (Cosmic Love)"

Mono/Poly – Monotomic (September 13)
 "Dive Out"

Quelle Chris – Gangster Music Vol. 1. (March 8)
 "Brain Of The Ape"

Sesame Street – "Give It, Live It, Respect" single (April 18)
 "Give It, Live It, Respect" (feat. Common ) (produced with BadBadNotGood)

Shay Lia – Dangerous (May 24)
 03. "Blue" (produced with BadBadNotGood)
 05. "Want You" (feat. Kojey Radical )

2020
Aluna – Renaissance (August 28)
 07. "The Recipe" (with Kaytranada and Rema) (single, August 28)
KAYTRANADA – "Look Easy" single

 01. "Look Easy" (feat. Lucky Daye)
 02. "Look Easy - Instrumental"
 03. "Look Easy - Extended Mix" (feat. Lucky Daye)

Lou Phelps – EXTRA EXTRA! EP

 03. "NIKE SHOE BOX"

Maeta – "Teen Scene" single

 "Teen Scene" (feat. Buddy)

Mick Jenkins – "Frontstreet" single (March 26)

 "Frontstreet (Freestyle)"

2021
Tinashe – 333
 06. "Unconditional"

Muzi - Interblaktic
 I Know It

2022
Ravyn Lenae
"Xtasy"

Kelela
 "On The Run"

PinkPantheress
 "Do you miss me?"

IDK (rapper) 
 "Dog Food"

Remixes

Unofficial tracks 
2009 (as Kaytradamus)
 "Getdownism"
 "Me, You and What?"
 "Minuit / Midi"
2010 (as Kaytradamus)
 "Aftershock/Jesus"
 "Anyone?"
 "Beggers"
 "Chipmonkey"
 "El Tricky"
 "Evacuate!" (Instrumental)
 "Fakin The Funk (Le Fin)"
 "Fell In Love"
 "God Put A Smile On My Face" (cover)
 "Good Music" (Instrumental)
 "Kaytra Nada's Theme"
 "Khayzumah Shabazz (Episode Uno – Born In These Streets)"
 "Let The Bass Slaps You"
 "Magnificent"
 "Paranoia"
 "Personal"
 "Startin' To Give Up"
 "The Coolest Remix"
2011 (as Kaytradamus)
 "A Jamaican BudWISEer/Too Wise"
 "Aidez Un Négrito"
 "Being Sexy"
 "Breakdance avec Kay"
 "Chocolate Tasty Milkshake"
 "Deep Dish"
 "Deux Cent"
 "El Bagay"
 "Hot Hoe"
 "I Know You"
 "Kay's Chinese Cabbage"
 "Love Took Us"
 "Mayer Hawthorne"
 "No Dancers Pt. 2 (Summer's Edition)"
 "Oh My Lawds"
 "Ooh Nah Yeah"
 "Petit Pays"
 "Rain In My Eyes"
 "Rocket Love"
 "Shook It"
 "TaDaTa"
 "The Future"
 "Told Too Many Times"
2012 (as Kaytradamus)
 "Evacuate" (feat. Miss Wonder)
 "FeelinQuiteSecsii"
 "New Seizures"
 "Regrets"
 "Summer Sadness"
 "Yeahman (Imasay)"
 "Down4U" (with Sango)
 "Voices from Heaven" (with Sango)
 "OriKay" (with Orijanus)
2013
 "Aloneness" (feat. Shay Lia)
 "Old Beat"
 "Seeu Enni Way"
 "Last Chance to Dance" (with Shash'u)
 "C'mon" (Feat. Kaytranada) (by Myth Syzer)
 "Black Mozart" (Instrumental) (The Celestics track)
2014
 "Lovelock" (feat. Shay Lia)
 "Victoria Bridge"
 "Widescreen" (feat. Kaytranada) (by Myth Syzer)
2015
 "81"
 "A Loser's Celebration"
 "Bow Bow" / "Feds Taking Pics"
 "Come Clean" (Hilary Duff Cover)
 "Ending Beat of the Mariah Remix"
 "Go Ahead"
 "Haitian Cook Out"
 "I've Got Your"
 "Kokaine"
 "Sub Bass"
 "Synthed"
 "Whateva U Want"
2016
 "C.O.D. Flip"
 "Nobody Beats the Kay"
2017
 "Chaos"
 "Windy:
2018
 "Chicago" (feat. Common)
 "Do We Have A Problem?" (Demo)
2020
 "Freefall" (Alternate) (feat. Durand Bernarr)
 "Hottest Shit"
 "KAYTRA2017 11 13 – Home"
 "KAYTRA2019 02 12"
 "KAYTRA2020 02 14 – BBNG"
 "KAYTRA2020 02 23 – Drugstore"
 "KAYTRA2020 04 16 I Don"t
 "Let Me Love You"
 "Wanna Be Your Lover"

Unconfirmed tracks

2007 (as Kaytradamus)
 "A Song For Liz"
 "Declivity"
 "Degradation"
 "Division"
 "Drop"
 "Harvest"
 "Rod Boogie"
 "She Thinks Soap's Sexy"
 "Surrender"
 "The Repercussion"
 "Twilight"
2008 (as Kaytradamus)
 "Afterlife"
 "Downfall"
 "Fruitage"
 "Goody Two Thoughts"
 "I Smile In Your Arms"
 "Jump"
 "Rhymes"
 "Smile"
 "Stairway To The Heart"
 "Third Stage"
 "Yearning For Full Thoughts"
 "You Think I Ain't Worth A Rod"
2009 (as Kaytradamus)
 "Pointy Blues"
 "Though Though Though"
2012 (as Kaytradamus)
 "Oh Snap
 "Sadness 1.0
 "Sweet Tooth" (Alternate) (with Krystale)
 "Robert Dit" (Instrumental) (with Robert Nelson)
2013
 "Around The World"
 "Drumline"
 "Eight Records"
 "Piano"
 "Piano Part II"
 "Zoe"
2014
 "Leave Me Alone" (Alternate) (feat. Shay Lia)
 "Lovecrimes"
 "Supreme"
 "Tacky"
 "The Black Sheep"
 "Worth It"
 "Charles Barkley" (Instrumental) (The Celestics track)
2015
 "I've Got You"
 "Pumped Up Kicks" (Foster the People cover)
 "Streams of Thought"
2016
 "Bus Bacc Home (Interlude)" (Instrumental)
 "Happy Conversations"
 "Lurking Around"
 "Twisted"
2017
 "Breezy"
 "Chain Reaction"
 "Everlong"
 "Hey Hey"
 "Vaporized Women"
 "Come Inside" (Alternate) (Lou Phelps track)
2018
 "A Song About Eskimos"
 "Forkplay"
 "Obsessed"
 "Vibrating Anxiety"
2019
 "Who Is It"

References 

Production discographies
Discographies of Canadian artists
Hip hop discographies